Sentenced for Life is a low budget 1960 British crime film, directed by Max Varnel and starring Basil Dignam, Jack Gwillim, Francis Matthews, and Jill Williams.

Plot 
Engineer John Richards is wrongly accused of selling secrets to enemy agents, and receives a life sentence in prison. Richards suspects his ex-partner Ralph Thompson is responsible for framing him, and asks his son, Jim, a law student, to investigate.

Cast 
Basil Dignam as Ralph Thompson
Jack Gwillim as John Richards
Francis Matthews as Jim Richards
Jill Williams as Sue Thompson
Mark Singleton as Edward Thompson
Nyree Dawn Porter as Betty Martin
Lorraine Clewes as Mrs. Richards
Arnold Bell as Williams
Philip Hollis as Turner
John M. Moore as Butler
Garard Green as Doctor

Critical reception
TV Guide called Sentenced for Life a "standard crime drama with a touch of espionage thrown in to spice up the incredibly bland stew", while Britmovie noted "you’ll struggle to stay awake whilst Francis Matthews attempts to resolve a miscarriage of justice."

References

External links
 

1960 films
British crime films
Films shot at New Elstree Studios
1960s English-language films
1960s British films